Kassopaia is a former municipality on the island of Corfu, Ionian Islands, Greece. Since the 2019 local government reform it is part of the municipality North Corfu, of which it is a municipal unit. It is located in the northeasternmost tip of the island of Corfu. It has a land area of 33.749 km² and a population of 2,185 (2011 census). The seat of the municipality was the town of Gimari (pop. 23). Its largest towns are Kassiopi (pop. 812), Nisáki (278), and Agnítsini (119).

Subdivisions
The municipal unit Kassopaia is subdivided into the following communities (constituent villages in brackets):
Gimari (Gimari, Vlachatika, Kavalleraina, Kalami, Kentroma, Plagia, Rachi)
Kassiopi (Kassiopi, Agios Georgios, Imerolia, Kellia, Lithiasmenos, Pigi, Plateia, Podolakkos, Psyllos dyo, Psyllos ena)
Nisaki (Nisaki, Apolysoi, Vinglatouri, Katavolos)
Sini (Agnitsini, Agios Stefanos Kassiopi, Vingla, Karyotiko, Kokkini, Kokkokylas, Kremithas, Mengoulas, Porta, Rou, Santa, Sarakinatika, Tritsi)

Islets

Peristeres
Plateia
Psyllos dyo
Psyllos ena

Population

See also
List of settlements in the Corfu regional unit

External links
Kassopaia on GTP Travel Pages

References

Populated places in Corfu (regional unit)